Saldula lomata is a species of shore bug in the family Saldidae. It is found in the Caribbean Sea, Central America, and North America.

References

Further reading

 

Articles created by Qbugbot
Insects described in 1985
Saldoidini